Pearl River is a census-designated place (CDP) in Neshoba County, Mississippi. It is one of the eight communities of the Mississippi Band of Choctaw Indians Reservation and the population is 80% Choctaw. The population was 3,156 at the 2000 census.

Geography

Demographics

2020 census

As of the 2020 United States Census, there were 3,822 people, 1,082 households, and 793 families residing in the CDP.

2000 census
As of the census of 2000, there were 3,156 people, 803 households, and 655 families residing in the CDP. The population density was 102.7 people per square mile (39.7/km). There were 838 housing units at an average density of 27.3/sq mi (10.5/km). The racial makeup of the CDP was 16.25% White, 1.43% African American, 80.35% Native American, 0.06% Asian, 0.10% from other races, and 1.81% from two or more races. Hispanic or Latino of any race were 1.08% of the population.

There were 803 households, out of which 50.8% had children under the age of 18 living with them, 43.0% were married couples living together, 28.0% had a female householder with no husband present, and 18.4% were non-families. 13.8% of all households were made up of individuals, and 3.0% had someone living alone who was 65 years of age or older. The average household size was 3.58 and the average family size was 3.87.

In the CDP, the population was spread out, with 39.3% under the age of 18, 10.8% from 18 to 24, 26.4% from 25 to 44, 15.1% from 45 to 64, and 8.5% who were 65 years of age or older. The median age was 25 years. For every 100 females, there were 92.6 males. For every 100 females age 18 and over, there were 98.4 males.

The median income for a household in the CDP was $26,352, and the median income for a family was $26,348. Males had a median income of $22,295 versus $19,167 for females. The per capita income for the CDP was $8,544. About 26.9% of families and 28.5% of the population were below the poverty line, including 28.3% of those under age 18 and 21.6% of those age 65 or over.

Education

Pearl River is served by the Neshoba County School District.

Native American students are eligible to attend schools in the Choctaw Tribal School System, a tribal school system operated by the Mississippi Band of Choctaw Indians.

Tribal schools in the CDP include:
 Pearl River Elementary School
 Choctaw Central Middle School
 Choctaw Central High School

References

Census-designated places in Mississippi
Census-designated places in Neshoba County, Mississippi
Mississippi Band of Choctaw Indians